Meero is an on-demand photography company headquartered in Paris. The company was founded in 2014 by Thomas Rebaud and Guillaume Lestrade. Meero uses AI and ML algorithms to streamline photo editing, while also acting as a marketplace of photographers around the world. In June 2019, Meero reported 31,000 clients in 100 countries, with 58,000 photographers on the platform. The company aims to build a community of professional photographers and serves as a platform to manage their photo shoots from the beginning to post-production.

Technology 
Artificial Intelligence (AI): Meero has invested in an AI capable of processing photo shoots in a few seconds, when currently a 60-minute photo shoot would require several hours of editing.

Funding 
By September 2017, Meero had raised $15 million in Series A funding. This round of funding was led by Alven Capital with participation from WhiteStar Capital and existing investors GFC and Aglae.

In July 2018, Meero closed a $45 million Series B round of funding led by Alven Capital, which renewed its investment, and Idinvest.

The company announced its Series C round of funding on the 19th of June, 2019. The capital infusion of US$230 million was led by venture capital firms Eurazeo Growth and Prime Ventures, with participation by Avenir Growth, GR Capital, Global Founders Capital, Alven, Aglae Ventures, White Star Capital and Idinvest Partners.

References

French companies established in 2016
Companies based in Paris
Photography companies of France
Mass media companies established in 2000